The Ulnes Bridge is a road bridge in the municipality of Nord-Aurdal in Innlandet county, Norway. The bridge crosses Stronda Fjord at Ulnes, just northwest of Ulnes Church, and it is a branch of Norwegian County Road 261 connecting it to European route E16. The bridge was opened on June 20, 2003. The new wooden bridge replaced an older concrete bridge from 1932 that was narrow and in poor condition.

See also
List of bridges in Norway

References

External links
TreFokus: Ulnes bru

Nord-Aurdal
Bridges in Innlandet
Roads in Innlandet
Wooden bridges
Bridges completed in 2003
Wooden buildings and structures in Norway